Semester at Sea is the second studio album by the American power pop band Valley Lodge, released in 2009. It was the first new studio recording by the band since their eponymous debut album, which was released in 2005.

The album includes a cover of Bob Welch's 1972 song "Sentimental Lady", which first appeared on the Fleetwood Mac album Bare Trees.

Track listing
"Break Your Heart" – 2:37 
"The Door" – 4:00
"When the Rain Comes" – 3:51
"Baby, It's a Shame" – 3:22
"Barricade" – 2:59
"If You Love Me" – 2:45
"Comin' Around" – 3:15
"My Baby" – 2:39
"Sentimental Lady" – 3:02
"Slow Dancin' (Romancin')" – 2:49
"Lose Your Man" – 3:10

Personnel
Dave Hill – vocals, guitar
John Kimbrough – vocals, guitar
Phil Costello – vocals, bass guitar
Rob Pfeiffer – drums

2009 albums
Valley Lodge (band) albums